Andréia Suntaque (born 14 September 1977), often referred to as simply Andréia, is a Brazilian former footballer who played as a goalkeeper.

Andréia was in Brazil's squad at the 1999 FIFA Women's World Cup, at which time she was playing for São Paulo FC. She was a member of the Brazilian team that won the silver medal at the 2004 Summer Olympics and the 2008 Summer Olympics.

Andréia was a member of the Brazil Women's Squad at the 2003 FIFA Women's World Cup. The next year Brazil were the runner-up at the 2004 Summer Olympics. In 2007 Brazil were the runner-up in the 2007 FIFA Women's World Cup after losing 2–0 in the final to Germany. The next year in the 2008 Summer Olympics Andréia lost her starting spot to Barbara, because Barbara "Would give Brazil a better chance to claim "Their First Ever Major Title". But Brazil failed to capitalize, they lost the final 1–0 against the United States in Extra Time. After the Game Andréia and Barbara were seen hugging each other and lying on the ground crying.  In 2011 the Brazil squad were ready to get in level terms on the world stage. They walked through their group winning all the games. They once again meet the USA squad in the Quarter Finals. In the second minute of the game a cross was sent in on the ground from Shannon Boxx, and then kicked into the Brazilian goal by a Brazilian defender Daiane. Marta went on to score twice to give Brazil the lead. Brazil thought they had a time management plan, but in the 122' minute USA midfielder Megan Rapinoe sent a ball into the Brazilian box. Andréia came way off her line missing the ball allowing US striker Abby Wambach to score the game tying header with just seconds left. The two teams went into a PK shoot out. On the first kick by Shannon Boxx, Andréia appeared to save the PK, but actually was many yards off her line. Boxx took another PK and slipped it right past Andréia. Then Carli Lloyd, Abby Wambach, Megan Rapinoe, and Ali Krieger scored their PK's to beat the Brazilian and send them out of the World Cup. In 2015 Andréia wasn't selected for the 2015 Women's World Cup Brazilian squad.

References

 UOL Olympica

1977 births
Living people
Brazilian women's footballers
Expatriate women's footballers in Spain
Brazilian expatriate sportspeople in Spain
Women's association football goalkeepers
Footballers at the 2000 Summer Olympics
Footballers at the 2004 Summer Olympics
Footballers at the 2008 Summer Olympics
Footballers at the 2012 Summer Olympics
Olympic footballers of Brazil
Olympic silver medalists for Brazil
Sportspeople from Paraná (state)
2011 FIFA Women's World Cup players
Olympic medalists in football
Santos FC (women) players
Medalists at the 2008 Summer Olympics
Medalists at the 2004 Summer Olympics
Brazil women's international footballers
Brazilian expatriate women's footballers
Zaragoza CFF players
2007 FIFA Women's World Cup players
2003 FIFA Women's World Cup players
1999 FIFA Women's World Cup players
São Paulo FC (women) players
Pan American Games gold medalists for Brazil
Medalists at the 2007 Pan American Games
Pan American Games medalists in football
Footballers at the 2007 Pan American Games